Frente Democrático Salvadoreño (FDS) (Salvadoran Democratic Front) was a broad front of democratic organizations that was formed in El Salvador in March, 1980. It consisted of, amongst others, Movimiento Independiente de Profesionales y Técnicos de El Salvador (MIPTES), Movimiento Popular Social Cristiano (MPSC), Movimiento Nacional Revolucionario (MNR), Trade Union federations, small business owners and a minor sector of dissident militaries. Amongst the militaries that joined FDS was the Colonel Ernesto Claramont, who had been the presidential candidate of National Opposing Union in 1977.

Two universities were affiliated as observers in FDS, Universidad de El Salvador and Universidad Centroamericana "José Simeón Cañas".

After only 17 days of existence FDS merged with Coordinadora Revolucionaria de Masas to form Frente Democrático Revolucionario.

References

Political history of El Salvador
Political party alliances in El Salvador
Salvadoran Civil War